Manta Air is a Maldivian domestic airline based in the Maldives, which began its operations on 24 February 2019.

History 
Manta Air welcomed its first aircraft on 12 November 2018. and officially unveiled its brand to the Maldives on 22 November 2018  The brand was officially unveiled by the Vice President of the Maldives, Mr Faisal Naseem.

Manta Air received the Air Operator's Certificate on 21 February 2019 and officially started its (land-based aircraft) operations on 24 February 2019.

Manta Air began its float-plane (sea-plane) operations on 17 November 2019.

Destinations 
As of 1 December 2019, Manta Air flies to 5 destinations.

Maldives
 Baa Atoll - Dharavandhoo Airport
 Dhaalu Atoll - Dhaalu Airport (base)
 Maafaru - Maafaru International Airport
 Malé – Velana International Airport
 Gan International Airport Addu

Fleet 
Manta Air operates the following aircraft (as of 25 December 2020).

References

External links 

Airlines of the Maldives
Airlines established in 2016
2016 establishments in the Maldives